Tin pest is an autocatalytic, allotropic transformation of the element tin, which causes deterioration of tin objects at low temperatures. Tin pest has also been called tin disease, tin blight or tin leprosy (lèpre d'étain).

It was observed in medieval Europe that the pipes of pipe organs were affected in cool climates. As soon as the tin began decomposing, the process accelerated.

With the adoption of the Restriction of Hazardous Substances Directive (RoHS) regulations in Europe, and similar regulations elsewhere, traditional lead/tin solder alloys in electronic devices have been replaced by nearly pure tin, introducing tin pest and related problems such as tin whiskers.

Allotropic transformation
At  and below, pure tin transforms from the silvery, ductile metallic  allotrope of β-form  white tin to the brittle, nonmetallic, α-form grey tin with a diamond cubic structure. The transformation is slow to initiate due to a high activation energy but the presence of germanium (or crystal structures of similar form and size) or very low temperatures of roughly −30 °C aids the initiation. There is also a large volume increase of about 27% associated with the phase change to the nonmetallic low temperature allotrope. This frequently makes tin objects (like buttons) decompose into powder during the transformation, hence the name tin pest.

The decomposition will catalyze itself, which is why the reaction speeds up once it starts; the mere presence of tin pest leads to  tin pest. Tin objects at low temperatures will simply disintegrate.

Possible historical examples

Scott expedition to Antarctica
In 1910 British polar explorer Robert Scott hoped to be the first to reach the South Pole, but was beaten by Norwegian explorer Roald Amundsen. On foot, the expedition trudged through the frozen deserts of the Antarctic, marching for caches of food and kerosene deposited on the way. In early 1912, at the first cache, there was no kerosene; the cans – soldered with tin – were empty. The cause of the empty tins could have been related to tin pest. Some observers blame poor quality soldering, as tin cans over eighty years old have been discovered in Antarctic buildings with the soldering in good condition.

Napoleon's buttons
The story is often told of Napoleon's men freezing in the bitter Russian Winter, their clothes falling apart as tin pest ate the buttons. This appears to be  an urban legend, as there is no evidence of any failing buttons, and thus they cannot have been a contributing factor in the failure of the invasion. Uniform buttons of that era were generally bone for enlisted, and brass for officers. Critics of the theory point out that any tin that might have been used would have been quite impure, and thus more tolerant of low temperatures. Laboratory tests of the time required for unalloyed tin to develop significant tin pest damage at lowered temperatures is about 18 months, which is more than twice the length of the invasion. Nevertheless, some of the regiments in the campaign did have tin buttons and the temperature reached sufficiently low values (below −40 °C or °F). In the event, none of the many survivors' tales mention problems with buttons and it has been suggested that the legend is an amalgamation of a case of disintegrating Russian tin buttons in an army warehouse in the 1860s and the desperate state of Napoleon's army, having turned soldiers into ragged beggars.

Modern tin pest since adoption of RoHS

With the 2006 adoption of the Restriction of Hazardous Substances Directive (RoHS) regulations in the European Union, California banning most uses of lead, and similar regulations elsewhere, the problem of tin pest has returned, since some manufacturers which previously used tin/lead alloys now use predominately tin based alloys. For example, the leads of some electrical and electronic components are plated with pure tin. In cold environments, this can change to α-modification grey tin, which is not electrically conductive, and falls off the leads. After reheating, it changes back to β-modification white tin, which is electrically conductive. This cycle can cause electrical short circuits and failure of equipment. Such problems can be intermittent as the powdered particles of tin move around. Tin pest can be avoided by alloying with small amounts of electropositive metals or semimetals soluble in tin's solid phase, e.g. antimony or bismuth, which prevent the phase change.

See also
Bronze disease – destruction of bronze artifacts by corrosion
Gold–aluminium intermetallic – giving rise to Purple plague or White plague, another failure mode for electronic components due to the formation of a crystalline substance.
Zinc pest – decay of zinc by an unrelated intercrystalline corrosion process.

References

External links

Metallurgy
Tin
Allotropes
Corrosion